A spill of the leadership of the Liberal Party of Australia took place on 3 April 1990, following the defeat of the Liberal Party at the federal election five days earlier. The spill was won by John Hewson over Peter Reith by 62 votes to 13. Reith was then elected deputy leader of the Party.

An election for the deputy leadership of the party was held, as under Liberal Party rules, all leadership positions are declared vacant after a general election, no matter what the outcome.

Background
Despite winning a slim majority (50.10 percent) of the two-party vote in the 1990 election, the Coalition came seven seats short of government. Andrew Peacock stood down as leader less than a year since he replaced John Howard, and supported his Shadow Treasurer John Hewson to replace him.

Candidates
 John Hewson, Shadow Treasurer, Member for Wentworth
 Peter Reith, Shadow Minister for Education, Member for Flinders
 Alasdair Webster, Member for Macquarie

Potential candidates who declined to run
 John Howard, Shadow Minister for Industry, Technology and Commerce, Member for Bennelong

Results

The following tables gives the ballot results:

Leadership ballot

Deputy leadership ballot

Other candidates:

 Peter Shack
 Julian Beale
 Ken Aldred
 Kathy Sullivan
 Bill Taylor

Aftermath
After his election as leader, Hewson endorsed former leader Peacock as his deputy, which caused a furore with Howard supporters, however, Peacock had no interest in becoming deputy leader again and withdrew happily. Peter Reith was instead elected deputy in a close contest against Peacock supporter David Jull.

References

Liberal Party of Australia leadership spills
1990 elections in Australia
Liberal Party of Australia leadership election